Elections to Wigan Council were held on 4 May 1978, with one third of the council up for election as well as vacancies in Ward 2 and 17. Previous to the election, a Labour councillor in Ward 9 defected to become an Independent Labour, reducing Labour's majority to 38. This seat was up for vote and became the only Labour gain of the night, as they suffered five losses to the Conservatives, and their majority reduced to 30 - half of what it was in 1973. The election seen a first of all wards being contested, with turnout rising marginally to 34.7%.

Election result

This result had the following consequences for the total number of seats on the Council after the elections:

Ward results

References

1978 English local elections
1978
1970s in Greater Manchester